Trix model construction sets were originally produced in 1931 by a Nuremberg company, Andreas Förtner (Anfoe). The German patent for the basic Trix pieces had been granted the previous year, in 1930.

The origin of the name Trix is uncertain; it has been suggested (by Adrie Wind]) that it could have referred to the triple-hole configuration of the basic pieces.

A friendship between Stephan Bing, owner of Anfoe, and the English toy manufacturer W J Bassett-Lowke led to the founding of the London company Trix Ltd in 1932. In the United Kingdom, Trix sets challenged the British-invented Meccano model construction sets.

(See Trix (company) for details of the model electric trains that the German company also began producing in 1935.)

References

External links 
 Trix construction sets website created by Adrie Wind; contains scans of most Trix manuals and brochures, mainly in Dutch, with some in German and some in English
 Eine kurze Geschichte des Trix-Metallbaukastens (tr. "A Short History of Trix Construction Sets") by Werner Sticht 

Construction toys
Educational toys
Model manufacturers of Germany